Pobegi is a settlement in the City Municipality of Koper in the Littoral region of Slovenia.

References

External links
Pobegi on Geopedia

Populated places in the City Municipality of Koper